Scandicci is a comune (municipality) of c. 50,000 inhabitants in the Metropolitan City of Florence in the Italian region Tuscany, located about  southwest of Florence.

Scandicci borders the following municipalities: Campi Bisenzio, Florence, Impruneta, Lastra a Signa, Montespertoli, San Casciano in Val di Pesa, Signa.

The settlement of Scandicci appeared in 1774 as Torri, and was later enlarged to incorporate several neighbouring communities.

Main sights
Villa i Collazzi, a Mannerist building whose design is attributed to Michelangelo.
Villa Pestellini
San Giuliano a Settimo - Badia or Abbey first documented from 774.
Sant'Alessandro a Giogoli- Romanesque-style Pieve or parish church first documented from 1035; it has a nave with two aisles (the latter, together with the transept, decorated in Baroque style). In the rectory is a fresco by Ridolfo del Ghirlandaio and a canvas by Francesco Conti.
Pieve di San Vincenzo
San Martino alla Palma- Church with a 16th-century portico. The interior, on a single nave, houses a 14th-century Madonna with Child Enthroned.
Sant'Andrea - Church at Mosciano, with some 13th-14th century paintings.
Acciaiolo - 14th century defense structure and aristocratic manor, now in public ownership.

Nearby is also the Badia a Settimo.

Public artwork
 "The Sun" sculpture of Aziz Ali Fuad

Twin towns - sister cities
 Pantin, France

Notable people
Paolo Cecconi

References

External links

 Official website

Cities and towns in Tuscany